Stakleni hotel (English: Glass Hotel) is the second studio album by the Yugoslav and Bosnian heavy metal band Divlje Jagode. The album was recorded in Belgrade in February 1981 and was released later that same year.

Track listing

Personnel
Ante Janković - lead vocals
Zele Lipovača - guitar
Alen Islamović - bass
Nasko Budimlić - drums

Production
Enco Lesić, Zele Lipovača - producers

References

1981 albums
Alen Islamović albums
Divlje jagode albums